Chnootriba similis, the teff epilachna beetle, is a species of lady beetle. It is a pest of teff in Ethiopia and feeds on its leaves.

References

External links
 Chnootriba similis at the Invasive Species Compendium.

Coccinellidae
Insect pests of millets